Michelle Anne O'Byrne (born 6 March 1968) is Australian politician for the Australian Labor Party. She was elected in the 2006 state election to the Tasmanian House of Assembly in the division of Bass. Prior to her election to state parliament she was a member of the Australian House of Representatives from 1998 to 2004, representing the Division of Bass. Until the defeat of the Labor government in the 2014 state election, she served in the Tasmanian cabinet as Minister for Health, Children and Sport & Recreation. She served in cabinet with her brother David O'Byrne, one of a very few pairs of siblings to have served in cabinet together anywhere in the world.

O'Byrne was born in Launceston, Tasmania, a grand-niece of a former Labor senator and President of the Senate, Justin O'Byrne.  She graduated from the University of Tasmania in 1992, with a Bachelor of Arts in General Studies. She was an organiser for the Liquor, Hospitality and Miscellaneous Union, and electorate officer to Senator Kerry O'Brien before entering politics. She won the federal seat of Bass in 1998, and again in 2001, but was defeated by her Liberal opponent Michael Ferguson in the 2004 election. Many put this down to concern about loss of forestry jobs under Labor's environment policy, which had the potential to adversely affect O'Byrne's electorate.

After more than a year out of politics, O'Byrne ran as a Labor candidate in the 2006 state election and was easily elected for the state seat of Bass, which covers the same territory as the federal seat. She topped the poll in the five-member electorate, receiving 23.3% of first preferences, helping ensure that Bass was the only seat to record a swing to Labor.

Prior to the 2010 election, O'Byrne was Minister for Environment, Parks, Heritage and the Arts, Minister for Tourism and Minister for Sport and Recreation in the Bartlett government.

References

 

1968 births
Living people
Australian Labor Party members of the Parliament of Australia
Australian Labor Party members of the Parliament of Tasmania
Labor Left politicians
Members of the Australian House of Representatives
Members of the Australian House of Representatives for Bass
Members of the Tasmanian House of Assembly
Women members of the Australian House of Representatives
Australian trade unionists
University of Tasmania alumni
21st-century Australian politicians
21st-century Australian women politicians
20th-century Australian politicians
Women members of the Tasmanian House of Assembly
20th-century Australian women politicians
Women deputy opposition leaders